Lake Rosebery is a man-made water reservoir located in the West Coast region of Tasmania, Australia. The lake is situated within the northern part of Tasmania's West Coast Range and is fed by the dammed Mackintosh and Murchison rivers.

Location and features
The Bastyan Dam across the Pieman River was built by the Hydro-Electric Commission in 1983.

The diverted Emu Bay Railway line and the Wee Georgie Wood Railway line run close to the lake.

See also

List of reservoirs and dams in Tasmania
List of lakes in Tasmania
List of power stations in Tasmania

References

Further reading

External links

"Lake Roseberry". Inland Fisheries Service

Rosebery
Pieman River Power Development
Rosebery